Gilgel Abay (ግልገል አባይ, Gǝlgäl Abbay), or Lesser Abay, is a river of central Ethiopia. Tributaries of the Gilgel Abbay include the Ashar, Jamma, Kelti and the Koger. It was regarded as the true source of the Nile for a long time and the Jesuit priest Pedro Paez visited it in 1618. The name Gilgel Abbay means Lesser Nile, as Abbay is the name for the Blue Nile.

Characteristics 
It is a meandering river, with a catchment area of 3887 km³. Near its mouth it is 71 meter wide, with a slope gradient of 0.7 metre per kilometre. The average diameter of the bed material is 0.37 mm (sand).

Sediment transport 
The river transports carries annually 22,185 tonnes of bedload and 7.6 million tonnes of suspended sediment to Lake Tana.

See also 
 List of Ethiopian rivers

References

Further reading 
 S. Uhlenbrook, Y. Mohamed, and A. S. Gragne, "Analyzing catchment behavior through catchment modeling in the Gilgel Abay, Upper Blue Nile River Basin, Ethiopia." Hydrol. Earth Syst. Sci., 14, 2153–2165, 2010
Hydrologic Impact of Land-Use Change in The Upper Gilgel Abay River Basin, Ethiopia; TOPMODEL http://www.itc.nl/library/papers_2010/msc/wrem/gumindoga.pdf

Tributaries of Lake Tana
Rivers of Ethiopia